Molla Zaman (also Romanized as Mollā Zamān; also known as Mulla Zamān) is a village in Chaqa Narges Rural District, Mahidasht District, Kermanshah County, Kermanshah Province, Iran. At the 2006 census, its population was 199, in 46 families.

References 

Populated places in Kermanshah County